Tetradium glabrifolium is a species of plant in the family Rutaceae (tribe Zanthoxyleae), with many synonyms but no subspecies listed in the Catalogue of Life.

References

External links 

Zanthoxyloideae
Flora of Indo-China
Flora of Malesia